Wadsworth is a civil parish in the metropolitan borough of Calderdale, West Yorkshire, England.   It contains 94 listed buildings that are recorded in the National Heritage List for England.  Of these, two are at Grade II*, the middle of the three grades, and the others are at Grade II, the lowest grade.  The parish contains the small settlements of Chiserley, Old Town, and Pecket Well, and is otherwise rural.  The list also includes two buildings from Calder Ward.  Most of the listed buildings are houses with associated structures and cottages, including laithe houses, farmhouses and farm buildings, and almost all of these are in stone with stone slate roofs and mullioned windows.  The  other listed buildings include a boundary stone, bridges, chapels and associated structures, a public house, a pinfold, guide posts and milestones, former mills, the gatehouse and lodges of a demolished house, a water garden and pumphouse, two ventilation shafts, and a war memorial.


Key

Buildings

Notes and references

Notes

Citations

Sources

Lists of listed buildings in West Yorkshire